Joseph Cheever was an American farmer and politician who held office in Saugus, Massachusetts.

Cheever was born on February 22, 1772. In 1816 he became Saugus' first Town Treasurer. He represented Saugus in the Massachusetts House of Representatives in 1817, 1818, 1820, 1821, 1831, 1832, and 1835. Cheever died on June 19, 1872 at the age of one hundred years, three months, and 28 days.

Notes
1. Until 1857, a majority of votes at a town meeting was needed to elect a representative to the Massachusetts House of Representatives. If no person received a majority of votes, no representative was sent. During his political career, Cheever frequently competed with his brother Abijah Cheever.

References

1772 births
1872 deaths
American centenarians
Members of the Massachusetts House of Representatives
Men centenarians
People from Saugus, Massachusetts